This is the discography for American country musician Mel McDaniel.

Studio albums

Compilation albums

Singles

Music videos

References

Country music discographies
discographies of American artists